The  Miss Mississippi USA competition is the pageant that selects the representative for the state of Mississippi in the Miss USA pageant. The pageant was directed by Premier Pageants from 2001 to 2010, before becoming part of Greenwood Productions in 2010 under the ownership of Miss Tennessee USA 1989 Kim Greenwood.

Mississippi has had 12 Miss USA placements as of 2021. They won Miss USA in 2020. The most recent placement was Asya Branch in 2020, winning the Miss USA 2020 title, becoming the 36th state to have the Miss USA title, 33rd to be crowned. Four titleholders have competed at Miss Teen USA, and as of 2007, four have competed at Miss America, including Branch.

Hailey White of Picayune was crowned Miss Mississippi USA 2022 on April 2, 2022, at Pearl River Resort in Philadelphia. She represented Mississippi for the title of Miss USA 2022.

Results summary

Placements
Miss USA: Asya Branch (2020)
1st runners-up: Leah Laviano (2008)
3rd runners-up: Cindy Williams (1986)
4th runners-up: Laurie Kimbrough (1979), Dana Richmond (1988)
Top 10/11/12: Kathy Manning (1987), Stephanie Teneyck (1990), Jennifer Adcock (2005), Breanne Ponder (2010)
Top 15/16: Marlene Britsch (1961), Patricia Ann Turk (1964), Bailey Anderson (2021)

Mississippi holds a record of 12 placements at Miss USA.

Awards
Miss Photogenic: Stephanie Teneyck (1990)

Winners 

Color key

1 Age at the time of the Miss USA pageant

References

External links
Official Website

Mississippi
Mississippi culture
Women in Mississippi
Recurring events established in 1952
1952 establishments in Mississippi